Iceland participated in the Eurovision Song Contest 2008 with the song "This Is My Life" written by Örlygur Smári, Paul Oscar and Peter Fenner. The song was performed by the duo Euroband. Songwriter Paul Oscar represented Iceland in the Eurovision Song Contest 1997 with the song "Minn hinsti dans" where he placed twentieth in the competition. The Icelandic entry for the 2008 contest in Belgrade, Serbia was selected through the national final Söngvakeppni Sjónvarpsins 2008, organised by the Icelandic broadcaster Ríkisútvarpið (RÚV). The selection consisted of eleven heats, a Second Chance round, four semi-finals and a final, held between 6 October 2007 and 23 February 2008. Eight songs ultimately competed in the final, where "This Is My Life" performed by Eurobandið emerged as the winner exclusively through public televoting. The duo was renamed as Euroband for the Eurovision Song Contest. 

Iceland was drawn to compete in the second semi-final of the Eurovision Song Contest which took place on 22 May 2008. Performing as the opening entry for the show in position 12, "This Is My Life" was announced among the 10 qualifying entries of the second semi-final and therefore qualified to compete in the final on 24 May. This marked the first time that Iceland qualified to the final of the Eurovision Song Contest from a semi-final since the introduction of semi-finals in 2004. It was later revealed that the Iceland placed eighth out of the 19 participating countries in the semi-final with 68 points. In the final, Iceland performed in position 11 and placed fourteenth out of the 25 participating countries, scoring 64 points.

Background 

Prior to the 2008 Contest, Iceland had participated in the Eurovision Song Contest twenty times since its first entry in 1986. Iceland's best placing in the contest to this point was second, which it achieved in 1999 with the song "All Out of Luck" performed by Selma. Since the introduction of a semi-final to the format of the Eurovision Song Contest in 2004, Iceland has, to this point, yet to qualify to the final. In 2007, Iceland failed to qualify to the final with the song "Valentine Lost" performed by Eiríkur Hauksson.

The Icelandic national broadcaster, Ríkisútvarpið (RÚV), broadcasts the event within Iceland and organises the selection process for the nation's entry. RÚV confirmed their intentions to participate at the 2008 Eurovision Song Contest on 10 July 2007. Since 2006, Iceland has used a national final to select their entry for the Eurovision Song Contest, a method that continued for their 2008 participation.

Before Eurovision

Söngvakeppni Sjónvarpsins 2008 
Söngvakeppni Sjónvarpsins 2008 was the national final format developed by RÚV in order to select Iceland's entry for the Eurovision Song Contest 2008. The seventeen shows in the competition were hosted by Ragnhildur Steinunn Jónsdóttir and Gísli Einarsson and all took place at the RÚV studios in Reykjavík. The shows were broadcast during the television programme Laugardagslögin on RÚV and online at the broadcaster's official website ruv.is.

Format 
Thirty-three songs in total competed in Söngvakeppni Sjónvarpsins 2008, where the winner was determined after eleven heats, a Second Chance round, four semi-finals and a final. Three songs competed in each heat between 6 October 2007 and 12 January 2008. The winning song from each heat, as determined by public televoting qualified to the semi-finals. Following each heat, a second round of televoting selected a wildcard act out of the remaining two non-qualifying acts. A jury selected three of the eleven wildcards for the Second Chance round on 12 January 2008, during which the top two songs, as determined by public televoting qualified to the semi-finals. Three songs competed in each semi-final on 19 January, 26 January, 2 February and 9 February 2008. The top two songs from each semi-final qualified to the final which took place on 23 February 2008. The results of the semi-finals and final were determined by 100% public televoting.

Competing entries 
On 10 July 2007, RÚV opened the submission period for interested songwriters to submit their entries until the deadline on 3 September 2007. Songwriters were required to be Icelandic, possess Icelandic citizenship or have permanent residency in Iceland by 1 October 2007, and had the right to submit up to three entries. At the close of the submission deadline, 146 entries were received. A selection committee was formed in order to select the top six entries, while additional twenty-seven entries came from nine composers invited by RÚV to each create three entries for the competition. The invited composers were:

Andrea Gylfadóttir
Barði Jóhannsson
Guðmundur Jónsson
Dr. Gunni
Hafdís Huld Þrastardóttir
Magnús Eiríksson
Magnús Þór Sigmundsson
Margret Kristin Sigurðardóttir
Svala Björgvinsdóttir

Among the competing artists were previous Icelandic Eurovision entrants Pálmi Gunnarsson, who represented Iceland in 1986 as part of ICY, Einar Ágúst Víðisson, who represented Iceland in 2000 as part of August and Telma, and Birgitta Haukdal, who represented Iceland in 2003.

Shows

Heats 
The eleven heats took place between 6 October 2007 and 12 January 2008. In each heat three acts presented their entries, and the winning entry voted upon solely by public televoting qualified directly to the semi-finals. An additional eleven entries, one per heat voted upon by an additional televote following each heat from the two remaining acts, were awarded wildcards for the Second Chance round.

Second Chance 
The Second Chance round took place on 12 January 2008 where three of the eleven wildcards selected by the jury competed. "Hvar ertu nú?" performed by Dr. Spock was voted upon solely by public televoting to proceed to the final.

Semi-finals 
The four semi-finals took place on 19 January, 26 January, 2 February and 9 February 2008. In each semi-final three acts presented their entries, and the top two entries voted upon solely by public televoting proceeded to the final.

Final 
The final took place on 23 February 2008 where the eight entries that qualified from the preceding four semi-finals competed. Eurobandið performed their entry in Icelandic in the heats and semi-final, however, they presented their entry in English in the final. The winner, "This Is My Life" performed Eurobandið, was determined solely by televoting. In addition to the performances of the competing artists, the show was opened by a medley featuring past Icelandic Eurovision entrants performing their songs.

Promotion 
Euroband made several appearances across Europe to specifically promote "This Is My Life" as the Icelandic Eurovision entry. On 24 April, Euroband was one of the guest performers of 1995 Icelandic Eurovision entrant Björgvin Halldórsson's Jólagestir Björgvins concert which was held at the Circus Building in Copenhagen, Denmark. On 25 April, Euroband performed during the UKEurovision Preview Party event which was held at the Scala Club in London, United Kingdom and hosted by Paddy O'Connell.

At Eurovision 

It was announced in September 2007 that the competition's format would be expanded to two semi-finals in 2008. According to Eurovision rules, all nations with the exceptions of the host country and the "Big Four" (France, Germany, Spain and the United Kingdom) are required to qualify from one of two semi-finals in order to compete for the final; the top nine songs from each semi-final as determined by televoting progress to the final, and a tenth was determined by back-up juries. The European Broadcasting Union (EBU) split up the competing countries into six different pots based on voting patterns from previous contests, with countries with favourable voting histories put into the same pot. On 28 January 2008, a special allocation draw was held which placed each country into one of the two semi-finals. Iceland was placed into the second semi-final, to be held on 22 May 2008. The running order for the semi-finals was decided through another draw on 17 March 2008 and Iceland was set to open the show and perform in position 1, before the entry from Sweden.

The two semi-finals and the final were broadcast in Iceland on RÚV with commentary by Sigmar Guðmundsson. The Icelandic spokesperson, who announced the Icelandic votes during the final, was Brynja Þorgeirsdóttir.

Semi-final 

Euroband took part in technical rehearsals on 13 and 16 May, followed by dress rehearsals on 21 and 22 May. The Icelandic performance featured the members of Euroband dressed in black and pink outfits and performing choreography, joined on stage by four backing vocalists in black outfits. The stage lighting were in deep blue and white colours. The backing vocalists that joined Euroband were: Grétar Örvarsson, Guðrún Gunnarsdóttir, Hera Björk Þórhallsdóttir and Pétur Örn Guðmundsson. Grétar Örvarsson previously represented Iceland in 1990 and 1992 as part of Stjórnin and Heart 2 Heart, respectively.

At the end of the show, Iceland was announced as having finished in the top 10 and subsequently qualifying for the grand final. This marked the first time that Iceland qualified to the final of the Eurovision Song Contest from a semi-final since the introduction of semi-finals in 2004. It was later revealed that Iceland placed eighth in the semi-final, receiving a total of 68 points.

Final 
Shortly after the second semi-final, a winners' press conference was held for the ten qualifying countries. As part of this press conference, the qualifying artists took part in a draw to determine the running order of the final. This draw was done in the order the countries appeared in the semi-final running order. Iceland was drawn to perform in position 11, following the entry from Poland and before the entry from Turkey.

Euroband once again took part in dress rehearsals on 23 and 24 May before the final. The duo performed a repeat of their semi-final performance during the final on 24 May. At the conclusion of the voting, Iceland finished in fourteenth place with 64 points.

Voting 
Below is a breakdown of points awarded to Iceland and awarded by Iceland in the second semi-final and grand final of the contest. The nation awarded its 12 points to Denmark in the semi-final and the final of the contest.

Points awarded to Iceland

Points awarded by Iceland

References

External links 
The homepage of the broadcaster, RUV

2008
Countries in the Eurovision Song Contest 2008
Eurovision